Fossil is a science fiction book  by  American writer Hal Clement, as part of the  Isaac's universe series. It was first printed in November, 1993.  Copyright was reserved to him under his real name,  Harry C. Stubbs and the company he associated himself with, Tomorrow, Inc.

Plot summary

On a medium-sized, low-gravity planet with a very slow rotational period, the side that is farthest from the sun is always a very hard mixture of frozen carbon dioxide, rock hard ammonia, and solid water ice, and the side that is closest, a sea of turbulent liquids and icebergs.  The planet rotates so slowly that the part that is half ice and half ocean is constantly beset with troubling weather conditions, ranging from blizzards to unanticipated ice melts and earthquakes.  It takes centuries if not thousands of years for the wobbling of the planet on the ecliptic to melt certain parts of the planet.   Even still, it is possible for the planet to have become locked in orbit, so the farthest side never melts.   The tidal locking of the planet may have occurred hundreds of millions of years ago, and seasons appear to be limited to the slight wobbling of the planet on the ecliptic.   Far from being an uninteresting planet, the ecliptic along which the planet travels is also tilted.  Most of the colonies are located along the "coast" - the place in a murky half-shadow of constant night and constant day.

Scientific researchers from all kinds of alien species from all over the known universe have come to this planet to engage in an arduous archaeological expedition to unearth mysterious fossils from deep within the multi-kilometer thick icy crust.  They have dug so deep that it is generally considered dangerous to dig any deeper.  On some of the worlds around the galaxy, mysterious relics are found from an earlier civilization that no longer exists.   Since the planet has almost no rock at its core, and enjoyed a rotational period for the first couple billion years of its existence, there is probably nothing to find here, short of fossils of earlier species once flourishing on the planet, but now extinct.

Universe 

In Isaac's universe, there are several highly intelligent species of aliens, all of whom are capable of learning from each other, and appropriating devices and inventions for their own purpose.   Not counting humans as intelligent beings, there are also intelligent snakes as big as pythons, winged arthropodic human-sized insect beings, whale-like beings confined to a liquid environment, and saurian reptilian creatures.  There is also an indistinct massive being without any arms or legs or mouths, but obtains its nutrition by dissolving its food through its hide, and although it does not move fast, it thinks very long and deeply.

Plot twist

When two human researchers obtain permission to come on board the planet's surface, and personally oversee the Safety Committee, the other species are sure this is a mistake.   Matters get even worse when the humans are observed skiing and leaping off the ski jumps they have built there.   The humans assure the other species that there is nothing hazardous because there is so little gravity on this planet.   Most of the species think having the humans on board, and engaged in these kinds of sports, is a recipe for disaster.   The human researchers don't seem to realize they aren't being taken seriously, and are only there because of the political pressure applied on their governments at home.   At least some of the aliens think it would be just fine if the humans were rubbed out, or at least relocated to a safer (or less important) part of the planet.

One of the winged species appears to have evolved on the planet because fossils of these creatures have been found kilometers under the surface, wedged into the rocks of ice down there, and from the condition of the fossils, the wings were rudimentary.   If this particular winged species actually did evolve on this planet, it would be a huge public relations victory elsewhere in the known universe, as it would appear to validate their claim that they were the first intelligent species in the galaxy, and therefore heir to intellectual property remaining in many lost ruins across the galaxy.

It is the goal of the human researchers to find out if some of the fossils have been fabricated and planted there, and whether any interlopers have arrived to interrupt their mission's progress.  To help determine whether the fossils are fraudulent, samples are sent off for DNA analysis.   However, the results are very troubling, as some of the fossils are apparently authentic.

See also
List of science fiction novels
Isaac Asimov
Isaac's Universe

1993 American novels
1993 science fiction novels
DAW Books books
Fiction set on ocean planets
Ice planets in fiction